Paper Television is the fourth LP from The Blow. It is also the band's first album as a duo consisting of Khaela Maricich and Jona Bechtolt. Previously, Khaela Maricich had been the sole member.

Track listing
 "Pile of Gold" – 2:12
 "Parentheses" – 3:33
 "The Big U" – 2:32
 "The Long List of Girls" – 2:55
 "Bonjour Jeune Fille" – 2:50
 "Babay (Eat a Critter, Feel Its Wrath)" – 3:09
 "Eat Your Heart Up" – 2:14
 "Pardon Me" – 3:13
 "Fists Up" – 4:14
 "True Affection" – 3:23

All songs produced, recorded, performed, and written by The Blow.

References

External links
 The Blow at K Records
 The Blow on Myspace

Paper Television, P
The Blow albums
K Records albums